PT Kalbe Farma Tbk, or simply known as Kalbe, is an Indonesian pharmaceutical, healthcare and nutrition company established in 1966. The company has expanded by strategic acquisitions of pharmaceutical companies, becoming an integrated consumer health and nutrition enterprise.
The Kalbe Group has brands in the prescription drugs, OTC drugs, energy drink and nutrition products, distribution arm that reaches over 1 million outlets. Notably, the company produces misoprostol (sold under the brand name of Invitec), a drug which is used to treat stomach ulcers but is also widely used in Indonesia as an illegal abortifacient (abortion-inducing substance).

Company brands in healthcare and pharmaceutical segments include Promag, Mixagrip, Woods, Komix, Prenagen and Extra Joss.

Kalbe is the largest publicly listed pharmaceutical company in Southeast Asia with around US$5 billion in market capitalization and revenues of over Rp 15 trillion.

History
Kalbe Farma was founded on September 10, 1966, by 6 siblings, K.L. Tjoen, Theresia H. Setiady, Khouw Lip Swan, Khouw Lip Boen (Also Known As: Dr. Boenyamin Setiawan), Maria Karmila, and F. Bing Aryanto. Kalbe Farma first began operations in a house garage that was owned by the founders.

In May 2020, Kalbe Farma signed a Memorandum of Understanding with South Korean pharmaceuticals company Genexine Inc. to develop a vaccine for the new corona virus or COVID-19.

References

 Company Presentation - Q3 - 2018

External links
 

1966 establishments in Indonesia
1991 initial public offerings
Indonesian companies established in 1966
Manufacturing companies based in Jakarta
Health care companies established in 1966
Health care companies of Indonesia
Pharmaceutical companies established in 1966
Pharmaceutical companies of Indonesia
Companies listed on the Indonesia Stock Exchange